George Walter Dobson (7 October 1897 – 1950) was an English footballer who played in the Football League for Barnsley, Norwich City and Rotherham County. Dobson guested for Stoke during World War I.

Career statistics
Source:

References

1897 births
1950 deaths
English footballers
Association football midfielders
English Football League players
Barnsley F.C. players
Norwich City F.C. players
Rotherham County F.C. players
Worksop Town F.C. players
Stoke City F.C. wartime guest players